Hans Brinker and the Silver Skates is a 1958 American television adaptation of the story of Hans Brinker, or The Silver Skates, directed by Sidney Lumet and starring Tab Hunter in the title role. It was broadcast by NBC as part of the Hallmark Hall of Fame.

Lumet and Hunter worked together again on That Kind of Woman later that year.

Cast
Tab Hunter as Hans Brinker
Peggy King as Rychie Van Gleck
Basil Rathbone as Dr Boekman
Jarmila Novotna as Dame Brinker
Carmen Mathews as Merrouw Van Gleck
Dick Button as Peter Van Gleck
Ralph Roberts as Raff
Ellie Sommers as Trinka
Paul Robertson as Pote

References

External links
Hans Brinker and the Silver Skates at IMDb
Hans Brinker and the Silver Skates at TCMDB

1958 television films
1958 films
Films based on American novels
Films set in the 19th century
Films set in the Netherlands
Hallmark Hall of Fame episodes
NBC network original films
Television shows directed by Sidney Lumet